The Bishop's Palace, which is also known as Llandaff Castle or Bishop's Castle or the Old Bishop's Palace, is the ruined residence of the bishops of Llandaff. It is located a short distance to the south of Llandaff Cathedral in Cardiff, Wales. The twin-towered gatehouse is one of the few remaining structures.

History

The surviving gatehouse resembles the architecture of Caerphilly Castle, which may indicate that the same master mason worked on both fortifications. This would date the Palace to the time of William de Braose who became Bishop of Llandaff in 1266. It is believed the Palace was attacked and damaged by Owain Glyndŵr in the rebellion of 1402–05, and was subsequently abandoned by the bishop of the period, who moved to live at Mathern Palace in Monmouthshire; bishops did not return to live near their cathedral again until 1850. The Bishops Palace was intact in 1610 when it was shown in a plan by John Speed, but was probably destroyed during the English Civil War.

The site

It had four irregular lengths of curtain wall, three towers and a gatehouse at the west corner. One of the towers was square and another was round, while the third has disappeared completely. The remains of the gatehouse survive to this day. It has two towers and originally had two storeys above the basement, a vaulted archway, a portcullis slot and a great oak door with much decorative ironwork. There would have been timber buildings within the courtyard, but there is now no sign of these.

The Bishop's Palace buildings are Grade I listed, meaning they are of exceptional architectural and historical interest.

See also
Grade I listed buildings in Cardiff
List of castles in Wales
Castles in Great Britain and Ireland

References

External links
 

Buildings and structures completed in the 13th century
Grade I listed buildings in Cardiff
Scheduled monuments in Cardiff
Llandaff
Llandaff
High Street, Llandaff